Mina Ahadi (born 1956) is an Iranian-Austrian political activist. As a Communist political activist, she is a member of the Central Committee and Politburo of the Worker-communist Party of Iran.

Advocacy
Mina Ahadi is opposed to faith-based laws and promotes citizenship rights and one secular law. Ahadi is also the main figure of International Committee Against Executions and International Committee Against Stoning. She is also the main founder of the German Central Council of Ex-Muslims. The Central Council of Ex-Muslims aims to break the taboo that comes with renouncing Islam and to oppose apostasy laws and 
Islam.

Life 
Ahadi's husband, who was also a political activist, was executed in Iran on the date of the couple's anniversary. His execution became her motivation to fight against capital punishment.

She lives and works in Germany and helped to gain the freedom of Nazanin Fatehi in Iran. Due to death-threats against her, she has been living under police protection from the moment of her public appearance as the chairwoman of the Central Council of Ex-Muslims. Since October 2018 she is official "ambassador" for the registered association intaktiv e.V. which is against circumcision of male children.

On 20 October 2007, she was awarded the Secularist of the Year prize by the UK's National Secular Society. Ahadi has two daughters.

See also
 Walid Husayin
 Ehsan Jami
 Maryam Namazie
 Arzu Toker

References

1956 births
Former Muslim critics of Islam
Iranian agnostics
Iranian anti–death penalty activists
Iranian communists
Iranian dissidents
Iranian former Shia Muslims
21st-century Iranian women politicians
21st-century Iranian politicians
Living people
People from Abhar
Worker-communist Party of Iran politicians
German critics of Islam
Former Muslims turned agnostics or atheists